Callitriche hamulata is a species of flowering plant belonging to the family Plantaginaceae.

Description
The leaves which can float on top of the water, are shorter and wider, they are also light brownish or pinkish green.
It has tiny inconspicuous green flowers and fruits, and has a flowering period of between May to October. or between April to September in the UK.

Taxonomy

It was then described by Wilhelm Daniel Joseph Koch before being widely published by Friedrich Traugott Kützing in 'Synopsis Florae Germanicae et Helveticae' Collection 246 in 1837.

The Latin specific epithet hamulata is derived from hamatus meaning "with hooks" or "hooked", referring to the hooked end of the leaves.

Distribution

Callitriche hamulata is native to a wide area, which stretches from Greenland, and Iceland, through Europe to North-western Africa.

It is widespread and fairly frequent in Britain, particularly in south eastern England.

Habitat
This plant can grow in shallow waters and can also adapt to a deeper water level, especially after flooding.
It can also be found in or near ponds, ditches, in still or slow moving water.

References

Plants described in 1837
Flora of Europe
Flora of Greenland
Flora of Iceland
hamulata